Leathers and Associates is an Ithaca-based family-owned playground construction company, best known for having coordinated community-led construction of large wooden playground parks in many towns across the United States during the 1980s and 1990s.

History

Robert ("Bob") Leathers founded Leathers and Associates in the early 1980s after he had coordinated about five playground construction projects in the 1970s, starting with Ithaca. Over the next couple decades, Leathers and Associates oversaw the construction of over 2,000 playgrounds, mostly in the United States, but also in Israel and Australia.

Leathers's playground projects quickly gained national attention. In 1982, The Washington Post called the unique approach to playgrounds a "burgeoning movement." In 1986, a Leathers playground was featured in an episode of the popular PBS children's television program Mister Rogers' Neighborhood. In 1989, the Chicago Tribune referred to Bob Leathers as "the guru of contemporary playground design."

In later years, Leathers and Associates was faced with growing safety and upkeep complaints concerning their older playgrounds. After Leathers' son Marc took ownership of the company in the 2005, Leathers and Associates transitioned away from an exclusive focus on community building projects and towards paid contract work.

Community playgrounds (1980s–1990s)

Construction process

The Leathers and Associates community playgrounds were largely paid for by fundraising. In 1989, a typical project cost between $10,000 and $60,000, with Leathers and Associates receiving $1,500 to $9,500. Construction was preceded by a planning process during which children in the community were asked to produce essays and drawings expressing their ideas and desires for the new playground. Leathers and Associates would advise and oversee the fundraising and planning process, while actual construction would be accomplished by a team of volunteers, usually over a period of four days.

Features

The characteristic feature of Leathers and Associates community playgrounds was a near-exclusive reliance on wood as the building material. Projects ranged in size from schoolyard playgrounds to 1.5-acre community park complexes. Playgrounds often included non-traditional features such as castles, drawbridges, child-sized wooden tunnels, PVC pipe "walkie-talkies," and tire swings, and often incorporated recycled objects, such as telephone poles, tires, and barrels.

Subsequent concerns

Communities with Leathers playgrounds from this time period have been faced with concerns over liability issues, inaccessibility for children with disabilities, and the need to meet increasing government safety regulations. At the time when the community playgrounds were being built, the wood being used was routinely treated with chromated copper arsenate, a compound subsequently banned because of the risk of arsenic leakage. Communities have faced expensive costs related to upkeep, restoration, replacement, or disassembly.

References

External links
 

Playgrounds
Wooden buildings and structures in the United States
Construction and civil engineering companies of the United States
Community-building organizations
Family-owned companies of the United States
Companies established in the 1980s